is a passenger railway station located in the town of Misaki, Kume District, Okayama Prefecture, Japan, operated by West Japan Railway Company (JR West).

Lines

Station layout
The station consists of one ground-level side platform serving a single bi-directional track. The station is unattended.

Adjacent stations

History
Obara Station opened on October 1, 1956.  With the privatization of the Japan National Railways (JNR) on April 1, 1987, the station came under the aegis of the West Japan Railway Company. A new glassed-in rain shelter on the platform was completed in March 2020. There is no station building and the station is unattended.

Passenger statistics
In fiscal 2019, the station was used by an average of 32 passengers daily..

Surrounding area
The surrounding area is surrounded by large fields, but there are private houses here and there. The area around the station runs parallel to Japan National Route 53.

See also
List of railway stations in Japan

References

External links

 Obara Station Official Site

Railway stations in Okayama Prefecture
Tsuyama Line
Railway stations in Japan opened in 1956